Denis Shapovalov was the defending champion but chose to compete in the gentlemen's singles instead. He lost to Jerzy Janowicz in the first round.

Alejandro Davidovich Fokina won the title, defeating Axel Geller in the final, 7–6(7–2), 6–3.

Seeds

Draw

Finals

Top half

Section 1

Section 2

Bottom half

Section 3

Section 4

Qualifying

Seeds

Qualifiers

Draw

First qualifier

Second qualifier

Third qualifier

Fourth qualifier

Fifth qualifier

Sixth qualifier

Seventh qualifier

Eighth qualifier

References
 Draw

External links

Boys' Singles
Wimbledon Championship by year – Boys' singles